James Madison High School is a public high school, named after U.S. President James Madison, located in the North East Independent School District in San Antonio, Texas in the United States.

Academia
Founded in 1976, Madison High School graduated its first class in 1980. The school won the Superintendent’s Pride Trophy for six consecutive years. Offering space for 3,200+ students, the school currently has the largest student population in its district.

Heroes Stadium
A Field, where the James Madison Mavericks play, they first played here June 4, 2009.

Agriscience Magnet Program
James Madison High School is home to an Agriscience Magnet Program. The program is one of the largest of its kind in Texas and government funded.

Sporting Achievements
In 2009, the Madison Mavericks Men's Bowling Team won the state championship which earned the high school its first ever Texas U.I.L qualified state championship trophy.

Notable alumni

Norm Charlton (Class of 1981) — Former Major League Baseball Relief Pitcher
David Edwards — Former Madison varsity football player and motivational speaker. Suffered paralysis in a game-time injury.
Jeff Foster (Class of 1995) — Former NBA basketball player
Keith O'Quinn — American football coach, former special teams coordinator for the Dallas Cowboys
Jared Padalecki (Class of 2000) — Actor 
Jocko Sims (Class of 1999) — Actor 
Todd Pletcher (Class of 1985) — American thoroughbred horse trainer
Sunny Anderson (Class of 1993) — Chef
Vincent Taylor (Class of 2013) — Current NFL defensive end for the Atlanta Falcons

References

External links
Official website
James Madison sports
Alma mater & school fight song

North East Independent School District
High schools in San Antonio
North East Independent School District high schools
Magnet schools in Texas
1976 establishments in Texas